Momi Zafran is an Israeli  football coach.

Honours
Toto Cup (Leumit) (1):
2010–11
Liga Leumit (1):
2010–11

References

Living people
1956 births
Israeli Jews
Israeli football managers
Maccabi Ahi Nazareth F.C. managers
Bnei Sakhnin F.C. managers
Hapoel Acre F.C. managers
Ahva Arraba F.C. managers
Hapoel Nir Ramat HaSharon F.C. managers
Israeli Premier League managers